Events in 2006 in Japanese television.

Debuts

Ongoing shows
Music Fair, music (1964-present)
Mito Kōmon, jidaigeki (1969-2011)
Sazae-san, anime (1969-present)
FNS Music Festival, music (1974-present)
Panel Quiz Attack 25, game show (1975-present)
Soreike! Anpanman. anime (1988-present)
Downtown no Gaki no Tsukai ya Arahende!!, game show (1989-present)
Crayon Shin-chan, anime (1992-present)
Shima Shima Tora no Shimajirō, anime (1993-2008)
Nintama Rantarō, anime (1993-present)
Chibi Maruko-chan, anime (1995-present)
Detective Conan, anime (1996-present)
SASUKE, sports (1997-present)
Ojarumaru, anime (1998-present)
One Piece, anime (1999–present)
MÄR, anime (2005-2007)
Naruto, anime (2002–2007)
Yu-Gi-Oh! Duel Monsters GX, anime (2004-2008)
Sgt. Frog, anime (2004-2011)
Bleach, anime (2004-2012)
Eyeshield 21, anime (2005-2008)
Kitty's Paradise PLUS, children's variety (2005-2008)
Doraemon, anime (2005-present)

Resuming

Endings

See also
2006 in anime
2006 Japanese television dramas
2006 in Japan
List of Japanese films of 2006

References